90 Ghanta ("90 Hours") is a 2008 Bengali psycho-thriller film directed by Sougata Roy Burman. The film was produced by Morpheus Media Ventures.

Plot
This film has a strikingly different storyline. It tells the tale of George, Rishin and his wife Mayuri. When George takes up a contract killing assignment from Rishin, he doesn't know his target and client are the same person. Rishin is a schizophrenic who wants himself dead. On realising this, George is torn between his professional ethics and a genuine concern for a fellow human being. Things get complicated when George discovers that Rishin's wife Mayuri is his ex-girlfriend. Mayuri tries to convince him against killing her husband. Meanwhile, George and Rishin have also bonded over a common passion, music. The film explores the dynamics of this complex scenario.

Cast
Tota Roy Choudhury
Jisshu Sengupta
Swastika Mukherjee
Yana Gupta
Manjusree Ganguly

Reception
Shoma from Sifymovies said that 90 Hours is filled with chills and thrills. He went on to say that the film is "slickly made" with some outstanding performances. A different opinion from the telegraph noted that "90 Ghanta has a smart script but falls short of becoming dark, sinister and unsettling due to poor directorial skills."

References

External links
 
 
www.telegraphindia.com review
 www.buzz18.com

2008 films
Bengali-language Indian films
2010s Bengali-language films